Mykhaylo Nechay (24 February 1930 - 15 August 2011) was a molfar (which Nechay described as meaning oracle, white witch or shaman) during the late 20th century and early 21st century.

Early life 
Mykhailo Nechay was born into a working-class family in 1930. He graduated from the regimental school in Uman. He served two years in the Soviet army in Armenia and Georgia. He lived in Verkhniy Yaseniv, Ivano-Frankivsk Oblast.

Nechay called himself a descendant of polkovnik Danylo Nechay. According to him, he discovered that he had the miraculous power to stop bleeding at the age of eight.

Career 
He became recognizable in Ukraine after 1989 when he became the first Chernivtsi molfar to be officially invited to the festival "Chervona Ruta" to ensure pleasant weather for the event.

Director Sergei Parajanov consulted Nechay before shooting for his film "Shadows of Forgotten Ancestors" to get a better understanding of the hutsul region and the hutsuls themselves. Actor Ivan Mykolaychuk consulted Nechay to learn how to play the drymba as Nechay was the head of the ethnographic folk ensemble, which was well known for playing drymby.

In March 2010, Nechay was given the title of Honored Worker of Ukraine Culture for his service of forty years, as the head of the drymbas amateur band "Strings Cheremosha."

In 2007 and 2009, the studio "Character" created two films about Nechay «Мудрість карпатського мольфара».

Nechay had two sons. His elder son Ivan served in the defense forces and later succumbed to cancer. His second son Mykhailo worked as Deputy Chairman for the Verkhovyna Administration.

Death 

On the morning of 15 July 2011, Nechay was killed in his house. According to witnesses, the suspected murderer had been trying for two days to get an appointment with molfar. As soon as he got an opportunity to be alone with Nechay, he killed him. On his way out, the murderer told the people outside who were waiting in queue to meet Nechay that he did not wish to be disturbed for a while.

Police investigations later revealed that the suspect was from the village Verkhniy Yaseniv. On the evening of 15 July 2011, a police officer from the Ivano-Frankivsk police department arrested the suspect in a wooded area near the village Bukovca. More than one hundred law enforcement officers were involved in the search operation. The suspect was a 33-year-old man who appeared to have a mental illness and had previously been convicted of killing a woman. After his release, he was treated for schizophrenia.

According to preliminary indications, the accused seemed to have killed Nechay because Nechay did not accept or respect the customs and norms of the Christian religion, and had confessed to being a pagan.

Legends 
According to several stories, on 25 February 2010 at the day of the inauguration of Viktor Yanukovych, molfar Nechay predicted the day of Viktor's death:

And after exactly three years it began «Euromaidan», after which Yanukovich's regime came to an end. And if the prophecy of Michael not to be taken literally, then we can consider it a self-fulfilling.

References

Links 
Сайт про Михайла Нечая
Molfar - Carpathian Features 2004
Последний мольфар - Михайло Нечай
Стаття про мольфарів
Нащадок козацьких характерників
Громовица Бердник: «Мольфар Нечай никому не передал свой дар. Он сам сказал это в последний день своей земной жизни» 

1930 births
2011 deaths
Hutsuls
Witchcraft in Ukraine